Paul Chambers is a former New Zealand Paralympic athlete. In the 1980 Summer Paralympics he won a gold medal in Men's 100 metres breaststroke 4.

References

External links 
 
 

Athletes (track and field) at the 1976 Summer Paralympics
Swimmers at the 1976 Summer Paralympics
Swimmers at the 1980 Summer Paralympics
Paralympic gold medalists for New Zealand
Paralympic bronze medalists for New Zealand
Living people
Year of birth missing (living people)
Medalists at the 1980 Summer Paralympics
Medalists at the 1976 Summer Paralympics
Paralympic medalists in swimming
Paralympic swimmers of New Zealand
New Zealand male breaststroke swimmers
Paralympic javelin throwers
Wheelchair javelin throwers